Lugovoy is a rural locality (a settlement) in Svetloyarsky District, Volgograd Oblast, Russia. The population was 467 as of 2010. There are 8 streets.

Geography 
Lugovoy is located 49 km southwest of Svetly Yar (the district's administrative centre) by road. Privolzhsky is the nearest rural locality.

References 

Rural localities in Svetloyarsky District